The Coalition of Northeastern Governors (CONEG) is a non-partisan organization of seven governors of the Northeastern United States. The organization was founded in 1976 and is headquartered in Washington, D.C. The organization deals with regional issues and provides a forum for intergovernmental cooperation.

Currently, the association comprises four Democrats and three Republicans. The current chairman is Republican Phil Scott of Vermont.

List of current northeast governors

External links
 CONEG website

State governors of the United States
1976 establishments in the United States
Government-related professional associations in the United States
Northeastern United States
Organizations based in Washington, D.C.
Organizations established in 1976